The Korg Collection 4 (Formerly Known as the Korg Legacy Collection and then simply the Korg Collection with Numbers denoting major updates) is the one of the largest collections of VST instruments from Korg and was released in 2004 with updates and more Synths added over time. The original 2004 release consists of the Korg MS-20, Korg Polysix and Korg Wavestation, and LegacyCell, a VST which layers combinations of any of the past 3 synths mentioned. In 2006, they added the Korg Mono/Poly, Korg M1, and Korg MDE-X Multi FX processor. On December 21, 2017, the ARP Odyssey was made into a VST and added to the collection, and the Korg Triton was added on for Christmas 2019. All of these synths were revamped in the spring of 2020 and renamed, collectively, the Korg Collection 2. With the addition of the Korg Triton Extreme, MiniKORG 700s and Korg Prophecy, it was renamed the Korg Collection 3. 

On Thanksgiving 2022, they added the microKORG, ELECTRIBE R and KAOSS PAD.

They use Korg's proprietary CMT (Component Modeling Technology) to emulate the original hardware. The Legacy collection is compatible with ASIO RTAS VST and stand alone so it can be used without a DAW. It is compatible with both the PC and Mac and the software was originally supplied on CD-ROM but can now be downloaded via Korg's online store.

Korg Legacy Collection (2004-17)

MS-20
Replicates the original monophonic synth but now has 32 voice polyphony. Complete with patch cables. Each knob can be controlled via MIDI.

Korg Polysix
The original was only 6-voice polyphonic, but is now up to 32 voices. The LFO and Arpeggiator can be synchronized to MIDI clock.

Korg Wavestation
The original had a 32 kHz sample rate and the new plug-in supports 44.1 through 96 kHz and 550 presets.

Korg Mono/Poly
Korg have added eight powerful virtual patches for near infinite modulation routing and up to 128 voices.

Korg M1
Is 8 part multi-timbral and features up to 256 notes of polyphony. Contains all 19 optional ROM cards, and the full sound set of the T Series.

Korg Collection (2017-21)
On December 22, 2017, Korg renamed from KORG Legacy Collection series to KORG Collection which now includes:

Arp Odyssey
This VST is released Following a physical hardware reissue of the ARP Odyssey in 2015 with help from David Friend, co-founder of ARP Instruments, this VST can Faithfully reproduce the sounds and parameters based on its original circuitry from its physical state.

Korg Triton
With the Keyboard and Rack versions of the Korg Triton released in 1999, and several versions to follow, this VST version faithfully replicates the original Korg Triton hardware, including all factory patches and waveforms, as well as a full collection of the additional EXB-PCM cards. Released December 26, 2019.

On April 14th, 2020, soon after the VST release of the Triton, all the previously released VSTs were overhauled and refined to such an extent that the entire collection was now referred to as 'Korg Collection 2'.

Korg Collection 3 (2021-22)
On July 28th, 2021, Korg released more VST versions of legendary KORG synths as well as making updates to the previously-released VSTs.

miniKORG 700s
A digital version to a revision of the first-ever (and most reliable) analog Korg synthesizer originally released in 1973. The VST Version of the miniKORG 700s comes with effect pedals built-in.

Korg Prophecy 
Originally a Monophonic Physical Modelling/Virtual Analog Synth with a three-octave keybed released in 1995, The VST version allows the user to import Sysex of user-made Korg Prophecy presets, as well as enabling edits that allow up to 256-voice Polyphony.

Korg Triton Extreme 
The culmination and Ultimate version of the Korg Triton, originally released in 2004 as a hardware synth, The VST version comes complete with a simulation of Valve Force technology, built into the Triton Extreme to add Guitar Amp-like warmth to whichever patches are selected.

Korg Collection 4 (2022-Present)
On November 24th, 2022, Korg released three more VST versions of legendary KORG synths.

microKORG
Since 2002, the microKORG is the company's longest continually-produced synthesizer, a diminutive version of the KORG MS-2000, and the VST includes presets from the original microKORG as well as its successor, microKORG S. Skins resembling special editions and rereleased microKORGs are also included. Whereas the microKORG originally had 4 Voice Polyphony, the VST version allows 64 voices. The VST version of microKORG is compatible with presets made for the original hardware microKORG, microKORG S and MS-2000.

ELECTRIBE R
The KORG ELECTRIBE R is a mainly Analog-based Drum Machine in the vein of Roland's 808, with a few PCM sounds in between.

KAOSS PAD
An Effects Processor and Sampler, the KAOSS PAD is now available as a VST.

References

External links
 KORG Collection

Software synthesizers
Audio software
Music technology